MIKE BASIN is an extension of ArcMap (ESRI) for integrated water resources management and planning. It provides a framework for managers and stakeholders to address multi-sectoral allocation and environmental issues in river basins. It is designed to investigate water sharing issues at international or interstate level, and between competing groups of water users, including the environment. MIKE BASIN is developed by DHI. As of September 2014, MIKE BASIN is no longer available for order or download from DHI. It has been replaced by the application named MIKE HYDRO Basin.

Applications
MIKE BASIN can be used for providing solutions and alternatives to water allocation and water shortage problems, improving and optimizing reservoir and hydropower operations, exploring conjunctive use of groundwater and surface water, evaluating and improving irrigation performance, solving multi-criteria optimization problems, establishing cost-effective measures for water quality compliance.

External links

Integrated hydrologic modelling
Hydraulic engineering
Environmental engineering
Physical geography